Willem Andries Liebenberg (born 31 August 1992) is a South African former rugby union player, who mainly played as a flanker for Blue Bulls then Top 14 sides Montpellier and La Rochelle.

Career

Provincial rugby

He also moved to the  where he played at Under–19 and Under–21 level.

He captained the  side during the 2015 Varsity Cup and named in a Varsity Cup Dream Team at the conclusion of the tournament which played one match against the South Africa Under-20s in Stellenbosch.

2012 Junior World Championship
Liebenberg was included in and named captain of the South Africa Under-20 squad for the 2012 IRB Junior World Championship. The team went on to win the tournament for the first time.

Honours

Club 
 La Rochelle
European Rugby Champions Cup: 2021–2022

References

South African rugby union players
Living people
1992 births
Blue Bulls players
Bulls (rugby union) players
Montpellier Hérault Rugby players
Stade Rochelais players
Afrikaner people
South African people of German descent
South African people of Dutch descent
South Africa Under-20 international rugby union players
Rugby union flankers
Rugby union players from the Western Cape